WAXE-LP is a Classic Hits and Classic Rock formatted broadcast radio station licensed to St. Albans, West Virginia, serving St. Albans, Nitro, and Scott Depot in West Virginia.  WAXE-LP is owned and operated by Coal Mountain Broadcasting, Inc.

References

External links
 

2016 establishments in West Virginia
Classic hits radio stations in the United States
Classic rock radio stations in the United States
Radio stations established in 2016
AXE-LP
AXE-LP